John Howard Davies (9 March 193922 August 2011) was an English director, producer and former child actor. He became famous for appearing in the title role of David Lean's film adaptation of Oliver Twist (1948). After joining the BBC as a production assistant in 1966, Davies became a hugely influential television director and producer, specialising in comedy.

Davies played a key role in British television comedy across four decades, working variously as the commissioning producer, producer or director on many of the most successful comedy shows of the era, including The World of Beachcomber, Steptoe and Son, All Gas and Gaiters, The Benny Hill Show, Monty Python's Flying Circus, The Goodies, Fawlty Towers, The Fall and Rise of Reginald Perrin, Not the Nine O'Clock News, Only Fools and Horses, Yes Minister, Blackadder and Mr. Bean. Davies was the producer of all four series of the hit BBC sitcom The Good Life, and was also responsible for ending Benny Hill's television career in the late 1980s.

Biography
Davies was born on 9 March 1939 in Paddington, London, the son of Jack Davies, a film critic and prolific scriptwriter for mainly Gainsborough and Elstree studios, and the novelist Dorothy Davies.

Child actor
Known to his friends as JHD, his credits as a child actor include the title role at the age of nine in David Lean's production Oliver Twist (1948), followed by The Rocking Horse Winner (1949), Tom Brown's Schooldays (1951) and a few episodes of the TV series William Tell (1958).

After a basic education at Haileybury School, he gained further education in Grenoble, France, followed by national service in the Navy.

Adult career
After being discharged from the Navy, Davies worked in the City of London financial sector, and then as a carpet salesman. He relocated to Melbourne, Australia, where he returned to acting and met his first wife, Leonie, when they both appeared in The Sound of Music. He was stage manager for The Sound of Music for two years touring Australia and New Zealand.

He is best known for his adult career as a director and producer of several highly successful British sitcoms. Returning to the UK, Davies became a BBC production assistant during 1966, and was promoted to producer in 1968. During this early period Davies worked on sketch shows such as The World of Beachcomber (1968), he produced and directed the first four episodes of Monty Python's Flying Circus (1969) (as well as defending the series against its detractors within the BBC), and he produced and directed the first two seasons of The Goodies (1970–72), including the classic "Kitten Kong" episode, which won the "Silver Rose of Montreaux" Eurovision TV award. He directed the young Anthony Hopkins in the first episode of the Biography series in "Danton", written by Arden Winch, and also worked on All Gas and Gaiters (1969–70) and the seventh series of Steptoe and Son in 1972.

He briefly left the BBC to become managing director of EMI Television Productions in 1973, but soon returned to the corporation. Davies produced and directed the first series of Fawlty Towers (1975). Casting Prunella Scales as Sybil Fawlty was Davies' idea, as the actress originally sought turned down the part; he is also credited with the idea of having the comedic changes to the lettering on the hotel sign in each episode, as well as the slapstick device of having Basil hit Manuel on the head with a spoon. Davies was producer for all four series of The Good Life (1975–78).

He was the BBC's Head of Comedy from 1977 to 1982, then Head of Light Entertainment, before joining Thames Television in 1985. Thames was then an ITV contractor, for which Davies was head of light entertainment from 1988. During the last role he was cited by the popular press as the man who fired comedian Benny Hill when the company decided not to renew his contract after a connection lasting 20 years. He told Hill's biographer Mark Lewisohn, "It's very dangerous to have a show on ITV that doesn't appeal to women, because they hold the purse strings, in a sense."

Davies subsequently produced No Job for a Lady (1990–1992) and Mr. Bean (1990), before returning to the BBC later in the 1990s. His final work for the BBC was directing the Easter Special of The Vicar of Dibley in 1996.

Death
Davies died from cancer on 22 August 2011 at his home in Blewbury, Oxfordshire.

Filmography

Film

References

Further reading
John Holmstrom, The Moving Picture Boy: An International Encyclopaedia from 1895 to 1995, Norwich, Michael Russell, 1996, p. 211.

External links

The TV IV – John Howard Davies

1939 births
2011 deaths
BBC executives
BBC television producers
Deaths from cancer in England
English male child actors
English male film actors
English male television actors
English television directors
English television producers
Male actors from London
People educated at Haileybury and Imperial Service College
People from Blewbury
Military personnel from London
Royal Navy sailors
20th-century Royal Navy personnel